Noise Viola is the debut album of the Brazilian instrumental music band Noise Viola. Produced by two member of the group (Paulo Barros and Fred Andrade) and Carlinhos Borges, the album was financed by Funcultura. It was released in 2007 and positively criticized around the country.

The releasing show of the album happened in Santa Isabel Theater, Recife, on July 14.

Track listing

Personnel
Breno Lira: viola, acoustic guitar (in "Maracatu em cinco")
Tomás Melo: percussion
Fred Andrade: electric guitar, acoustic guitar (in "Primeira pá de cal", "Maracatu bonito" and "Vou sonhar mais um pouquinho que é pra dar tempo de você ver"), vocals (in "Vou sonhar mais um pouquinho que é pra dar tempo de você ver")
Paulo Barros: acoustic guitar (all tracks except "Primeira pá de cal", "Lídio macacão", "Vou sonhar mais um pouquinho que é pra dar tempo de você ver" and "Maracatu em cinco")

Special guests:
Bozó: seven strings guitar (in "Lídio macacão")
Carlinhos Borges: keyboards (in "São Jorge só tem um")
Cláudio Negrão: acoustic bass (in "Nino, o pernambuquinho" and "Vou sonhar mais um pouquinho que é pra dar tempo de você ver")
Ebel Perrelli: drums (in "Vou sonhar mais um pouquinho que é pra dar tempo de você ver")
Edilson Staudinger: piano (in "Maracatu em cinco")
Homero Basílio: congas (in "Violado") and derbak, wood blocks and egg shaker (in "Espelho cego")
Marcinho Eiras: electric guitar (in "Música feia")
Passarinho Gomes: tambourine (in "Nino, o pernambuquinho" and "Lídio macacão")

References

2007 albums
Noise Viola albums